Bucholz Army Airfield  is a United States Army airfield located on Kwajalein Atoll, Marshall Islands. Its position is ideal for refueling during trans-Pacific flights, and the airport is available to civilians through Air Marshall Islands and United Airlines.

Since the entirety of Kwajalein Atoll is a military base, non-military passengers on commercial flights are transported to and from the neighboring island of Ebeye, the civilian population center of Kwajalein Atoll.

History 

Bucholz Army Airfield was initially built by the Japanese in 1943 as part of a large naval base. It came under heavy air attacks in late 1943 to neutralize the island. The atoll was assaulted by American forces on 31 January 1944. Employing the battle hardened tactics developed under fire during the Battle of Tarawa, the United States launched a resolute dual assault on the main islands of Kwajalein in the south and Roi-Namur in the north. The Japanese put up ill-fated resistance, though outnumbered and under-prepared. The futile Japanese defense left only 4 survivors of an original garrison of 3,500.

After the defeat of the Japanese, Kwajalein was developed into a major United States Military airbase and staging area for further operations by Seabees of the 109th Naval Construction Battalions  with CBs 74, 107, and 3rd Bn 20th Marines) assisting. After repairing and expanding the captured Japanese airfield, the United States Army Air Forces (USAAF) moved Headquarters, Seventh Air Force from Nanumea to the airfield in April 1944, and moved the B-24 Liberator-equipped 11th Bombardment Group from Tarawa and 30th Bombardment Group from Abemama to Bucholz at the beginning of April. From Kwajalein, the heavy bombers struck at enemy targets in the Marshall Islands. Along with the heavy bomber groups, the USAAF reassigned the F-5 (P-38 Lightning)-equipped 28th Photographic Reconnaissance Squadron to Kwajalein to fly long-range photographic missions over the Marshalls and reported directly to Headquarters, Seventh Air Force. The USAAF combat units remained until late 1944 until being moved forwards into the Marianas, being assigned to airfields on Guam and Saipan. The United States then used Kwajalein as a maintenance and supply hub, supplying forward bases with supplies and equipment.

After the war, the United States used Kwajalein as a main command center and preparation base for Operation Crossroads and an extensive series of nuclear tests (comprising a total of 67 blasts) at the Marshalls' atolls of Bikini and Enewetak. Later, in the 1950s and 1960s, Bucholz became part of the Atomic Energy Commission Pacific Testing Area.

Marshall Islands were officially made a Territory of the United States, and became an independent republic in 1986, Kwajalein atoll is still used by the United States for missile testing and various other operations. Although this military history has deeply influenced the lives of the Marshall Islanders who have lived in the atoll through the war to the present, the military history of Kwajalein has made tourism almost non-existent and has kept the environment in relatively pristine condition. American civilians and their families who reside at the military installations in Kwajalein are able to enjoy this environment with few restrictions.

As of 2009, Bucholz Army Airfield is still operated by the United States Army. All civil and military operations require 24 hours' prior permission, and passengers transiting through Kwajalein on the same aircraft are not permitted to deplane.

Airlines and destinations

See also 

 List of United States Army airfields
 USAAF in the Central Pacific
 Island Hopper scheduled air service

References

External links 
 USAKA Airfield Services
 Bucholz Army Airfield
 Pictures of Airport
 AirNav airport information for PKWA
 pacificwrecks.com
 Maurer, Maurer (1983), Air Force Combat Units Of World War II, Maxwell Air Force Base, Alabama: Office of Air Force History 

Airports in the Marshall Islands
Kwajalein Atoll
Airfields of the United States Army Air Forces Air Transport Command in the Pacific Ocean Theater
Airfields of the United States Army Air Forces in the Pacific Ocean theatre of World War II
Marshall Islands in World War II
United States Army airfields
1943 establishments in the Marshall Islands